Modou Ndow (born 10 February 2000) is a Gambian footballer who plays for Wallidan FC.

Career
On 22 December 2018 it was confirmed that Ndow had joined Seattle Sounders FC, renamed as Tacoma Defiance from 2019, for the whole 2019 season, on loan from MFK Vyškov.

In January 2020, he appeared to be back at Wallidan FC, as the club announced on Facebook, that he had been loaned out to Sudanese club Al-Merrikh SC. He appeared to be back at Wallidan FC in 2021.

References

External links
Tacoma bio

2000 births
Living people
Gambian footballers
Gambian expatriate footballers
Association football defenders
USL Championship players
Tacoma Defiance players
Gambian expatriate sportspeople in the United States
Expatriate soccer players in the United States
Expatriate footballers in Sudan